CIPAC, Christians' Israel Public Action Campaign is an American, Christian pro-Israel advocacy group.

History

CIPAC was founded after the 1991 Prayer Breakfast for Israel as a Christian movement to support Israel.

External links
 CIPAC website

References

Israel friendship associations
Pro-Israel political advocacy groups in the United States